The University Network of the European Capitals of Culture(UNeECC), an international non-profit association, was founded upon the initiative of the University of Pécs in Pécs, Hungary in December 2006 by 15 founding members.

UNeECC invites memberships in three different categories:
 Full Membership: universities from cities of the European Capitals of Culture
 Associate Membership: universities from applicant cities
 Supportive Membership: all others, including cities and cultural organizations with parallel interests

The Secretariat of UNEECC is at the University of Pécs in Hungary.

General Assemblies and Annual Conferences

 2007: Sibiu – ’Town and Gown’
 2008: Liverpool – ’ Whose Culture(?)’
 2009: Vilnius – ’Innovation, Creativity and Culture’
 2010: Pécs
 2011: Antwerp 
 2012: Maribor 
 2013: Marseille Seventh Interdisciplinary Conference of the University Network of the European Capitals of Culture
 2014: Umeå
 2015: Plzeň
 2016: Wrocław

In 2007 the UNeECC GA and Conference was hosted by Lucian Blaga University in Sibiu. The Keynote Speaker of the Conference was Mr. Roger O’Keeffe Principal Administrator, from European Commission Directorate for  Education and Culture. 
In 2008 the GA and Annual Conference was organized by Liverpool Hope University and the University of Liverpool. The Keynote Speaker of the Conference was Prince Charles-Louis d’Arenberg. 
In 2010, when the European Capital of Culture programme celebrated its 25th anniversary.
The University of Pécs hosted the General Assembly and Annual Conference of UNeECC. We were organizing a joint conference of UNeECC and the Compostela Group of Universities providing a unique platform for scientific collaboration and networking. 
In 2011, UNeECC celebrated its 5th year of founding. The Annual Conference was held in Antwerp, Belgium, European Capital of Culture 1993. 
In 2012 UNeECC organized its Annual Conference jointly with EMUNI and the University of Maribor in Maribor, Slovenia, European Capital of Culture 2012. 
In 2013 UNeECC organized its Annual Conference jointly with Aix-Marseille University and EHESS - School for Advanced Studies in the Social Sciences  in Marseille, France, European Capital of Culture 2012..

Members 
UNeECC currently has 47 members:
KU Leuven (through its Antwerp campus), Antwerp, Belgium
University of Antwerp, Antwerp, Belgium
Aarhus University, Aarhus, Denmark
University of Athens, Athen, Greece
Avignon University, Avignon, France
College of Europe, Bruges and Warsaw, Belgium and Poland
ICHEC Brussels Management School, Brussels, Belgium
Vesalius College, Brussels, Belgium
Cork Institute of Technology, Cork, Ireland
University College Cork, Cork, Ireland
University of Genoa, Genoa, Italy
FH Joanneum – University of Applied Sciences, Graz, Austria
Bahcesehir University, Istanbul, Turkey
Istanbul Technical University, Istanbul, Turkey
Istanbul University, Istanbul, Turkey
Cracow University of Economics, Krakow, Poland
The Pontifical University of John Paul II in Krakow, Poland
AGH – University of Science and Technology, Krakow, Poland
University of Applied Sciences Kufstein Tirol, Kufstein, Austria
Université Catholique de Lille, Lille, France
University of Lille 1, Science and Technology, Lille, France
Liverpool Hope University, Liverpool, England
University of Luxembourg, Luxembourg, Luxembourg
Universidad Alfonso X el Sabio, Madrid, Spain
University of Maribor, Maribor, Slovenia
University of Malta, Msida, Malta
University of Patras, Patras, Greece
University of Pécs, Pécs, Hungary
Universita degli Studi di Perugia, Perugia, Italy
Ladislav Sutnar Faculty of Design and Art, University of West Bohemia, Pilsen, Czech Republic
University Fernando Pessoa, Porto, Portugal
“Lucian Blaga” University of Sibiu, Sibiu, Romania
University of Stavanger, Stavanger, Norway
School of Architecture – Faculty of Engineering, Aristotle University of Thessaloniki, Greece
Umea University, Umea, Sweden
University of Economics, Varna, Bulgary
Vilnius Gediminas Technical University, Vilnius, Lithuania
Mykolas Romeris University, Vilnius, Lithuania
University of Wroclaw, Wroclaw, Poland
Turiba University, Riga, Latvia
UCLouvain (through its FUCaM Mons campus), Mons, Belgium
University of Dubrovnik, Dubrovnik, Croatia
Széchenyi István University, Győr, Hungary
Juraj Dobrila University of Pula, Pula, Croatia
Neapolis University of Pafos, Pafos, Cyprus
University of Novi Sad, Novi Sad, Republic of Serbia
Università degli Studi della Basilicata, Potenza, Italy

See also

References

External links
 UNeECC official website
 European Commission-Culture
 UNeECC is 'unique'
 Liverpool Hope University hosts UNeECC Conference 2008
 Annual Conference of UNeECC in Vilnius

Higher education organisations based in Europe
Organizations established in 2006